Bodo Sperlein is a German-born designer.

Having studied Three Dimensional Design at Camberwell College of Arts, part of the University of the Arts London. He set up a self-titled design consultancy where he is Creative Director at the Oxo Tower on London's South Bank where he still works.

Early life

Sperlein was born in Germany, before moving to London, where he studied Design at Camberwell College of Arts (now part of the University of the Arts London).

Works

Sperlein initial work focused on ceramics, as well as lighting, furniture and interior accessories creating collections such as Black Berry and White Sculptural.

In his early career, he developed a collection of tableware for Thomas Goode called Grandiflora and a home accessory collection for fashion store Browns and also creating a collection of giftware for historic porcelain manufactures Nymphenburg, established 1747.

Following this Sperlein' studio worked on collaborations with brands such as Lladró, Mulberry, Swarovski, Hakkasan and Jarosinski & Vaugoin.

More recently Sperlein' has worked for brands such as Nikko, Lladró, and Dibbern, his tableware is featured at restaurants.

Triangelis Church 
In 2016 Bodo was approached for a bespoke commission by Triangelis church in Erbach, near Frankfurt in Germany.

The brief was to design a font, ambo and candle holder to be installed following the renovation of the neo-gothic church.

Lladró
Sperlein' work historic porcelain brand Lladró, created a range of porcelain jewellery, lighting and home accessories from element of their figurines.  The large-scale Magic Forest chandelier was exhibited as part of a solo show at the England and Co. contemporary art gallery in 2008 along with a series of wood mirrors and a lit mirror called Eclipse, made from the material Corian.

Swarovski

Along with a range of other fashion and homeware designers, Sperlein was invited to participate Swarovski Crystal Wedding Project, creating table decorations inspired by the institution of marriage.

Nikko

Bodo Sperlein collaborated with the Japanese manufacturer Nikko Ceramics, for whom Sperlein designed collections (Bodo Sperlein for Nikko products) also consulting on marketing strategy. They have currently produced seven tableware collections, including the Sensu, Blossom and Macaroon ranges, as well as the Blossom Lighting design.

Dibbern

Sperlein produced several ranges for Dibbern. These include the Black Forest, Golden Forest, Golden Pearl, Golden Timber, Golden Leaf, and Delice collection.

Phil Howard

Sperlein's tableware has featured in Phil Howard's Michelin starred restaurant, The Square, for several years. Sperlein has created a signature hand-painted plate for The Square and has been featured in both The Square: Savoury and The Square: Sweet cookbooks.

Bodo Sperlein for Tane

Bodo Sperlein was chosen by, TANE, to launch its hollowware collection globally.

Loewe
In January 2016, the German home entertainment brand, Loewe appointed Bodo Sperlein as Creative Director. In December 2017, Bodo stepped down from the role of Creative Director in order to focus on other projects and collaborations. He continues to provide creative consultancy for Loewe.

References 

German industrial designers
Dinnerware designers
Living people
Year of birth missing (living people)